Joan Manuel Muñoz Melgarejo (born 20 April 1989) is a Chilean footballer that currently plays for the Primera División club Unión San Felipe as a left midfielder.

External links
 Muñoz at Football Lineups

1989 births
Living people
People from Rancagua
Chilean footballers
Association football midfielders
O'Higgins F.C. footballers
Deportes Colchagua footballers
Colo-Colo footballers
Chilean Primera División players